The Bappagay is a river of Sakha Republic, Russia, a right tributary of the Vilyuy.

See also
List of rivers of Russia

References 

Rivers of the Sakha Republic